Fruid Water is a river in the Scottish Borders area of Scotland. The valley it occupies has been dammed to form the Fruid Reservoir. The river is a tributary of the Tweed, with a confluence about 2 km upstream of Tweedsmuir. The river has a catchment area of 23.7 km2, and a mean flow rate of 0.66 cubic metres per second leaving the reservoir.

References

Rivers of the Scottish Borders
Tributaries of the River Tweed
1Fruid